After Dark is an album by James Blood Ulmer's Music Revelation Ensemble recorded in 1991 and released on the Japanese DIW label featuring performances by Ulmer with David Murray, Amin Ali and Cornell Rochester.

Reception

The AllMusic review by Thom Jurek awarded the album 4 stars, stating, "MRE is fast becoming Ulmer's most successful and consistent outlet. What's more because of its innovation and hard rocking intensity and groove, it's totally fine to say you like jazz-rock again".

Track listing
All compositions by James Blood Ulmer
 "Interview" – 7:36  
 "Never Mind" – 12:15  
 "Maya" – 10:05  
 "After Dark" – 12:45  
 "Back Talk" – 7:15  
 "What's Your Name" – 10:27  
 "Iceman" – 8:31

Personnel
James Blood Ulmer – guitar
David Murray – tenor saxophone
Amin Ali – electric bass
Cornell Rochester – drums
On track 4 add the Intercity String Quartet: 
Ronald Lawrence – viola
Jason K. Hwang, Rudi Berger – violin 
Michelle Kinney – cello

References 

1992 albums
James Blood Ulmer albums
David Murray (saxophonist) albums
DIW Records albums